Tamaulipas State Highway 1 ( TAL 1 ) is a highway that runs from Nuevo Laredo, Tamaulipas Mexico west to Nuevo Leon State Highway 1 ( NL 1 ) on the Nuevo Leon / Tamaulipas borderline. This highway with its Nuevo Leon side connects Nuevo Laredo with Anáhuac, Nuevo Leon.

Mexican State Highways
Transportation in Laredo, Texas